The Wami tilapia (Oreochromis urolepis) or Rufiji tilapia is a species tilapiine cichlid that is native to Morogoro Region of Tanzania. It is an important food fish and has been introduced to several other countries, although most of these populations possibly are hybrids with close relatives, especially Mozambique and Nile tilapia.

This tilapia is found in fresh and brackish waters.

The two subspecies, geographically separated, are:
 O. u. hornorum (Trewavas, 1966) (Wami tilapia)
 O. u.urolepis (Norman, 1922) (Rufigi tilapia)

References

 https://www.itis.gov/servlet/SingleRpt/SingleRpt?search_topic=TSN&search_value=170018

urolepis
Endemic freshwater fish of Tanzania
Fish described in 1922